Paso Doble is a German NDW band that formed in 1983. Their songs Computerliebe, Herz an Herz and Fantasie have appeared on several Best of NDW/new wave compilations. They are well known for their unique sound as well as their unusual style and choreography, which have a Spanish style to go with the band's name, Paso Doble.

Career

In 1979, Rale Oberpichler, a young singer who worked mainly as a background vocalist, wanted to go solo and was looking for a song writer. She met Frank Hieber, a pianist, keyboarder and composer who had worked with various groups and singers including Rio Reiser, Nena, and Peter Schilling on his international hit Major Tom (Coming Home). Together they formed Paso Doble.

In 1985 they released their first single Computerliebe ("computer love", not to be confused with the Kraftwerk song with the same name), which debuted on the TV show "Extratour" and hit No. 1 on the charts for several weeks. They also had a very well received appearance in the Hitparade in March 1985. The first album they released was Fantasie and the title track also spent several weeks at No. 1.

What would have been their second album, Versunkener Schatz, which they produced in 1986, was never released. 2 of the songs were published as singles: Herz an Herz and Magische Nacht. The album was eventually made available to the public via downloads on AOL, iTunes, and MusicLoad.

The band decided to shift their work to a production and publishing side, while still releasing the occasional single and remixes. In 1992 they founded the "Paso Doble Music Publishing House". 

They returned to the stage after having some hiatus.  

A new 12" single,  Message Angekommen, in 2005. Their two most famous songs, Computerliebe and Herz An Herz, have been covered by Das Modul and Blümchen, respectively.

2020 marked a comeback, and a new album was released.

Releases

Albums
Fantasie (LP Album)
Computerliebe (CD "Best of" Album)
Magische Nacht (Download only Album)
Urknall (LP)

Singles
Computerliebe (Die Module spielen verrückt) (7″)
Computerliebe (Special Disco Version) (12″)
Fantasie (7″)
Fantasie (12″ Maxi)
Herz an Herz (12″)
Herz an Herz (7″)
Magische Nacht (12" Promo)
Allein im All (CD Maxi)
Message angekommen (12″)
Kleine Killer

External links
German Links
Official Site
Basic version of the Official Site
English Links
Paso Doble @ Discogs.com

References

Neue Deutsche Welle groups
German new wave musical groups
German synthpop groups
German techno musicians